Blood Lake: Attack of the Killer Lampreys is a science fiction horror film directed by James Cullen Bressack and starring Shannen Doherty, Jason Brooks, Christopher Lloyd, Ciara Hanna, Fred Stoller, Rachel True, Jeremy Wade, and Zack Ward. The film was distributed by The Asylum. It premiered on the Animal Planet cable TV channel (US) on Sunday May 25, 2014, at 8:00 p.m. EST and was released to DVD the following Tuesday.

Plot
Ted Jargenson, a city maintenance employee, is checking on a remote roadside pipe when he is attacked and killed by several hungry  lampreys. Roughly a week later, Michael Parker, his wife Cate, daughter Nicole and son Kyle move to the small lakeside town for the summer, as Michael is tasked with controlling the lamprey population in Lake Charlevoix. Meeting the local fish and wildlife department, consisting of Will, Rich, and Marcy, Michael learns that these lampreys are particularly hungry and seem to be feeding aggressively on the fish population, effectively destroying it. The mayor, Bruce Akerman, demands that Michael fix the problem within a day so that no tourist revenue is lost to the town.

Soon, the lampreys begin feeding on people, first attacking Rich when he sets out on the lake to try to get a lamprey count. His body is found and brought to the morgue where lampreys burst from his chest cavity and kill the coroner, before they escape into the pipes and infiltrate the water system. Despite this, Mayor Akerman still refuses to shut down the lake and Michael talks to the press himself. When Mayor Akerman sees this, he gets Michael fired by calling a favor in with Michael's boss.

Meanwhile, Michael and Cate's flirtatious summer neighbor Ellen invites her pool boy Alex over to clean her pool. She intends to seduce him by surprising him in the pool when he gets there. Alex has coincidentally started a summer fling with Nicole and invites her with him to Ellen's house, having been told that Ellen will be out running errands. After arriving, the two discover Ellen's body in the pool being devoured by lampreys. Cate hears their screams and runs next door and call the police. An officer arrives and he's promptly eaten by the lampreys in the pool, which allows Cate, Nicole, and Alex to escape.

The lampreys attack the town en masse, through pipes and any water sources outside. Cate and Nicole go to rescue young Kyle (who went to the beach earlier as lampreys begin attacking) while Alex goes to check on his own family. Mayor Ackerman is also killed during this time by a lamprey that enters his body as he sits on the toilet. Will convinces Michael to help him despite being fired and they witness Marcy being attacked and killed by lampreys. They plan to shut down the main water system before the lampreys can escape into Lake Michigan and discover several dead throughout town including the mayor.

They encounter Cate and Nicole, who are busy trying to rescue Kyle from an attic storage area where he's barricaded himself. They succeed once Alex shows up with a ladder and everyone is able to escape the town. They resolve to use the bio salts from the dead lamprey's livers to lure the live ones to the main water plant where they can electrocute them. They eventually succeed in their plan of electrocuting all the lampreys at the main power plant but Will is lost to the lampreys. As the town cleans up and Michael and his family leave, having seemingly solved the crisis, a lamprey attacks a member of the cleanup crew.

Cast
 Jason Brooks as Michael Parker
 Shannen Doherty as Cate Parker
 Zack Ward as Will
 Christopher Lloyd as Mayor Bruce Akerman
 Ciara Hanna as Nicole Parker
 Koosha Yar as Kyle Parker
 Fred Stoller as Rich
 Rachel True as Marcy
 Jeremy Wade as Lamprey Expert
 Susie Abromeit as Ellen
 Jody Barton as Jim
 Nicholas Adam Clark as Alex
 Mark Christopher Lawrence as Ted Jargenson 
 Mike Jerome Putnam as Officer Samuels
 Ase Justice as Homeless Guy

Reception

Dread Central rated the film a score of 2.5 out of 5, stating that the film "never quite reaches the giddy b-movie heights of similar slithery cult favorites Slugs and Squirm". HorrorNews.net gave the film a positive review, writing, "It’s cheesy, self-referencing, has no pretense at all, and it’s just a stupid good time. If you go into it expecting a horror film, you will hate it. But if you come into it realizing it is farce, you will enjoy every minute of it."

The New York Times reviewed the film along with another film premiering on TV the night before on Chiller, Deep in the Darkness. The film was mostly panned with considerable criticism doled out to the method of death given to Christopher Lloyd's character, with the reviewer calling it "revolting in ways that may haunt you long after this otherwise unmemorable film is over". Andre Manseau from Arrow in the Head awarded the film a rating of 4/10, criticizing the film's wooden acting, poor special effects, and erratic characters, although had different sentiments on Christopher Lloyd's character and death, saying "he's got the best death scene in the movie". The review also compares Blood Lake to other killer lake-creature film series like Lake Placid, Piranha, and even The Asylum's own Sharknado, but claims it never rises to their level of entertainment.

See also
 The Host (The X-Files)

References

External links
 Official site at The Asylum
 

2014 television films
2014 films
2014 independent films
2010s science fiction horror films
2014 horror films
American science fiction horror films
American independent films
The Asylum films
Direct-to-video science fiction films
American natural horror films
2010s monster movies
American horror television films
American science fiction television films
2010s English-language films
Films directed by James Cullen Bressack
2010s American films